Vasta may refer to:

Vasta, Estonia, a village
Vasta Blackwood or Vas Blackwood (born 1962), British actor 
Angelo Vasta (1941–2021), Australian former jurist
Joe Vasta, American lacrosse player
Ross Vasta (born 1966), Australian politician

See also
Bath broom (Finnish: vasta)